Michael Beckam Donovan (October 18, 1881 – February 3, 1938) was a  professional baseball player. He played parts of two seasons in Major League Baseball for the Cleveland Naps in 1904 and the New York Highlanders in 1908, primarily as a third baseman. In seven career games, he had five hits and two RBIs, all of them with the Highlanders. He batted and threw right-handed.

Donovan was born in Brooklyn, New York and died in New York, New York. Donovan was working for Consolidated Edison as a security guard when he was accidentally shot and died, after a co-worker's gun accidentally discharged.

References

External links

Major League Baseball third basemen
Cleveland Naps players
New York Highlanders players
Hartford Senators players
Springfield Ponies players
Toledo Mud Hens players
Shreveport Pirates (baseball) players
Wilkes-Barre Barons (baseball) players
Troy Trojans (minor league) players
Fall River Indians players
Johnstown Johnnies players
Lancaster Red Roses players
Reading Pretzels players
Minor league baseball managers
Baseball players from New York (state)
Deaths by firearm in New York City
1881 births
1938 deaths
Firearm accident victims in the United States
Accidental deaths in New York (state)
Burials at Calvary Cemetery (Queens)